January 14 - Eastern Orthodox liturgical calendar - January 16

All fixed commemorations below are observed on January 28 by Eastern Orthodox Churches on the Old Calendar.

For January 15th, Orthodox Churches on the Old Calendar commemorate the Saints listed on January 2.

Saints
 Monk-martyr Pansophius of Alexandria (c. 250)
 Martyrs Elpidios, Danax, and Helen.  (see also: January 16)
 Virgin-Martyr Charitina of Amisus (c. 304)  (see also: September 4, October 5)
 Venerable Paul of Thebes (341)
 Holy 6 Monk-Martyrs of the Desert, who reposed peacefully.
 Venerable Salome of Armenia, and Venerable Perozhavra of Sivnia, Georgia (c. 361)
 Saint Isidore of Scété (died c. 390), Egyptian priest and desert ascetic
 Venerable Alexander the Ever-Vigilant, founder of the Monastery of the Unsleeping Ones ("the Ever-Vigilant"), at Gomon, in north-eastern Bithynia (c. 426-427) (see also: February 23, July 3)
 Venerable John Calabytes, the "hut-dweller" of Constantinople (c. 450)
 Venerable Prochorus, Abbot in the Vranski Desert on the River Pchinja, in Bulgaria (10th century)

Pre-Schism Western saints
 Virgin-martyr Secundina, scourged to death near Rome in the persecution of Decius (c. 250)
 Martyr Ephysius of Sardinia (303)
 Saint Maximus, Bishop of Nola (c. 250)
 Saints Maura and Britta, two holy virgins in France (4th century)
 Saint Eugippius, ordained priest at Rome, was biographer of St Severinus of Noricum (535)
 Saint Íte of Killeedy (Ytha, Meda), Hermitess in Ireland and foster-mother of Saint Brendan (570)
 Saint Maurus, disciple of St. Benedict of Nursia (584)
 Saint Lleudadd (Laudatus), first Abbot of Bardsey Island, Wales (6th century)
 Saint Sawyl Penuchel, the father of Asaph of Wales (6th century)
 Saint Tarsicia of Rodez, an Anchoress who lived near Rodez, sister of St. Ferréol of Uzès (600)
 Saint Malard, Bishop of Chartres, present at the Council of Châlon-sur-Saône in 650 (c. 650)
 Saint Bonitus, Bishop of Clermont and Confessor, later a monk (c. 710)
 Saint Emebert, an early Bishop of Cambrai (c. 710)
 Saint Ceolwulf of Northumbria, King of Northumbria, encouraged monastic life (764)
 Saint Blaithmaic (Blathmac), an Abbot from Ireland, went to Scotland and was martyred by the Danes on the altar steps of the church of Iona (c. 823)

Post-Schism Orthodox saints
 Venerable Gabriel, founder of Lesnovo Monastery, Serbia-Bulgaria (12th century)
 Venerable Barlaam of Keret Lake (16th century)

New martyrs and confessors
 New Hieromartyr Benjamin, Bishop of Romanov (1930)
 New Hieromartyr Michael Samsonov, Priest (1942)

Icon gallery

Notes

References

Sources
 January 15/January 28. Orthodox Calendar (PRAVOSLAVIE.RU).
 January 28 / January 15. HOLY TRINITY RUSSIAN ORTHODOX CHURCH (A parish of the Patriarchate of Moscow).
 January 15. OCA - The Lives of the Saints.
 The Autonomous Orthodox Metropolia of Western Europe and the Americas (ROCOR). St. Hilarion Calendar of Saints for the year of our Lord 2004. St. Hilarion Press (Austin, TX). pp. 7–8.
 January 15. Latin Saints of the Orthodox Patriarchate of Rome.
 The Roman Martyrology. Transl. by the Archbishop of Baltimore. Last Edition, According to the Copy Printed at Rome in 1914. Revised Edition, with the Imprimatur of His Eminence Cardinal Gibbons. Baltimore: John Murphy Company, 1916. pp. 15–16.
Greek Sources
 Great Synaxaristes:  15 ΙΑΝΟΥΑΡΙΟΥ. ΜΕΓΑΣ ΣΥΝΑΞΑΡΙΣΤΗΣ.
  Συναξαριστής. 15 Ιανουαρίου. ECCLESIA.GR. (H ΕΚΚΛΗΣΙΑ ΤΗΣ ΕΛΛΑΔΟΣ). 
Russian Sources
  28 января (15 января). Православная Энциклопедия под редакцией Патриарха Московского и всея Руси Кирилла (электронная версия). (Orthodox Encyclopedia - Pravenc.ru).
  15 января (ст.ст.) 28 января 2013 (нов. ст.). Русская Православная Церковь Отдел внешних церковных связей. (DECR).

January in the Eastern Orthodox calendar